The Chomutov–Reitzenhain railway and its branch to Vejprty is a branch line (Czech: regionální dráha) in the Czech Republic, that was originally built and operated by the Buschtěhrad Railway Company (BEB). It begins in Chomutov (Komotau), crosses the Ore Mountains, and ends today in the border station of Vejprty (Weipert), where there is a connexion to the German railway network over the Vejprty–Annaberg-Buchholz railway. The branch from Křimov to Reitzenhain has been closed since 1972.

References

Sources 
 Jan Kadlec: Zaniklá železniční trať Křimov–Reitzenhain, Oblastní muzeum v Chomutově, 2005 
 Miroslav Jelen: Zrušené železniční tratě v Čechách, na Moravě a ve Slezsku, Dokořán 2009, 
 Siegfried Bufe, Heribert Schröpfer: Eisenbahnen im Sudetenland, Bufe-Fachbuchverlag, Egglham 1991, 
 Zdeněk Hudec u.a.: Atlas drah České republiky 2006-2007, 2. Auflage; Verlag Pavel Malkus, Prague, 2006,

External links 
 
 Chomutov–Vejprty at www.zelpage.cz
 1944 Chemnitz–Weipert–Komotau timetable
 1944 Chemnitz–Reitzenhain–Krima timetable
 www.zeleznice.vanovi.net Křimov - Marienberg 
 Historic maps and plans e.g. Reitzenhain and Weipert stations
 Description and photos 

Railway lines in the Czech Republic
Transport in the Ore Mountains